Owen Cosby Philipps, 1st Baron Kylsant (25 March 1863 – 5 June 1937) was a British businessman and politician, jailed in 1931 for producing a document with intent to deceive.

Background
Philipps was the third of five sons of the Reverend Sir James Erasmus Philipps, 12th Baronet, of Picton Castle, and his wife the Hon. Mary, daughter of the Hon. and Rev. Samuel Best and sister of the fifth Baron Wynford. Born in Warminster vicarage, Wiltshire, and educated at Newton College, Newton Abbot, Devon, he became an apprentice with a Newcastle upon Tyne shipping firm, Dent & Co, in 1880 and upon completion of his apprenticeship he moved to the Glasgow shipping firm Allan & Gow in 1886.

Shipping career
With financial assistance from his eldest brother John Philipps, 1st Viscount St Davids Philipps set up his own shipping firm Philipps & Co in 1888, bought his first ship in 1889 and by the end of the nineteenth century the two brothers owned two shipping lines (King Line Ltd and the Scottish Steamship Company), a finance company (the London Maritime Investment Company), and the London and Thames Haven Petroleum Wharf. Taking advantage of a low share price, the brothers acquired shares in the Royal Mail Steam Packet Company, and by 1902 Owen had become chairman and managing director of the line. Over the next twenty years he and the Royal Mail Steam Packet Company acquired a controlling interest in more than twenty other companies, including the Union-Castle Line and the Pacific Steam Navigation Company. Acquisitions continued, culminating in the purchase of the White Star in 1927.

Philipps was also a Member of Parliament until 1922. In 1923 he was created a peer as Baron Kylsant, which gave him a seat in the House of Lords.

Kylsant gained a reputation for acting unilaterally and autocratically, without consulting other board members. At the same time, the complex share structure of the companies within the Royal Mail Steam Packet Company group allowed him to continue his control of the group while hiding trading losses in individual firms by moving reserves around. In 1924 Kylsant also became chairman of Harland and Wolff, the Belfast shipbuilders.

Political career
Since his time in Scotland, Philipps had been interested in politics and after two unsuccessful attempts to stand for Parliament he was elected as Member of Parliament for Pembroke and Haverfordwest as a Liberal in 1906.  Reelected at the General Election in January 1910 he declined to stand again at the second general election in December 1910. It was immediately reported that he would seek the nomination for the West Carmarthenshire constituency, especially in view of his plans to live in the constituency, at Coomb Mansion, the birthplace of Lady Philipps.  It was envisaged that the contest for the nomination would be between Philipps and John Hinds. However, he eventually trailed a distant third at the selection conference held at Water Street Chapel, Carmarthen, and the nomination went to Hinds .

He later left the Liberal Party and joined the Conservative Party being elected unopposed as the Member for City of Chester at a by-election in 1916.  Re-elected at the 1918 General Election he served until 1922, but did not stand again.

Other offices and honours
In 1904, Philipps was High Sheriff of Pembrokeshire and became a deputy lieutenant for Pembrokeshire in 1917, and Lord Lieutenant of Haverfordwest in 1924. In 1909, Philipps was invested as a Knight Commander of the Order of St Michael and St George (KCMG), later raised to Knight Grand Cross (GCMG) in 1918.

In 1912 he was invested as a Knight of Grace of the Order of Saint John of Jerusalem and raised to a Knight of Justice in 1916.

On 14 February 1923, he was elevated to the peerage as Baron Kylsant, of Carmarthen in the County of Carmarthen and of Amroth in the County of Pembroke.

Following his conviction he resigned all his knighthoods and lieutenancies; when he attempted to resign from his clubs, however, the offer was firmly refused.

Downfall and trial

In 1928 Kylsant applied to extend the government guarantee on a loan from the Midland Bank. When the application was refused, his shipping group defaulted on part of the next repayment.  Much of the group's finances were based on debenture stock paying fixed interest at five per cent, and the main trustee of this stock was Kylsant's older brother, Viscount St Davids, who was unhappy with the way debenture stock was being issued, especially a £2,000,000 issue in 1928. St Davids made his concerns public, and the stock market values of the whole group declined sharply.  Worried by these revelations and fearing an economic crisis, the British government appointed the accountant William McLintock to investigate the group's finances.  His report issued in early 1930 revealed that Royal Mail Steam Packet Company had liabilities in excess of £10,000,000.  This was enough for the banks to act, and much of Kylsant's powers were removed to trustees appointed by the banks, although Kylsant remained chairman until November 1930. In February 1931 Kylsant and his wife went to South Africa on holiday, and in his absence McLintock revealed that for several years the Royal Mail Steam Packet group had been paying dividends to stockholders despite trading at a loss.  McLintock did not report this activity as fraudulent, although politicians used the term when the matter was discussed in the House of Commons.

On his return from South Africa Kylsant was arrested and charged with making false statements with regard to company accounts for 1926 and 1927, contrary to section 84 of the Larceny Act 1861.  The company auditor, Harold John Morland, was charged with aiding and abetting the same offences. Kylsant was also charged with issuing a document (the prospectus issued for the 1928 debenture stock issue) with intent to deceive, contrary to section 84 of the Larceny Act 1861. Both men were committed for trial at the Old Bailey.

The trial took place in July 1931 and lasted for nine days, presided over by Mr Justice Wright.  Both men pleaded not guilty to all charges. At the end of the trial, while both men were found not guilty of the first two charges, Kylsant was found guilty of the final charge of issuing a document with intent to deceive. Morland was discharged and Kylsant was sentenced to twelve months' imprisonment. After one night in prison he was released on bail, pending an appeal against the conviction.  Kylsant's appeal against the conviction and sentence was heard in November 1931, when it was dismissed, and he subsequently served ten months in Wormwood Scrubs prison before being released in August 1932.

In his obituary, The Times reported:

Personal life 
Owen Philipps married at Carmarthen on 16 September 1902 Mai Alice Magdalene Morris, daughter of Thomas Morris, of Coomb, Carmarthenshire. They had three daughters. When Lord Kylsant died at the age of 74, the barony became extinct as he had no sons. His daughter Nesta Philipps, who had married George Coventry, later the 10th Earl of Coventry, inherited her father's house, Amroth Castle in Pembrokeshire.

References

External links 
 
 

1863 births
1937 deaths
People from Warminster
People stripped of a British Commonwealth honour
Barons in the Peerage of the United Kingdom
Philipps, Owen
Philipps, Owen
Philipps, Owen
Philipps, Owen
Philipps, Owen
Philipps, Owen
Philipps, Owen
UK MPs who were granted peerages
Lord-Lieutenants of Haverfordwest
Younger sons of baronets
Welsh fraudsters
High Sheriffs of Pembrokeshire
British politicians convicted of crimes
British politicians convicted of fraud
Deputy Lieutenants of Pembrokeshire
Knights Commander of the Order of St Michael and St George
Barons created by George V